Alberto Dou Mas de Xaxàs (21 December 1915, Olot–10 April 2009, San Cugat del Vallés) was a Spanish Jesuit and mathematician.

He fought on the Nationalist side in the Spanish Civil War.

In 1960, he was elected president of the Royal Spanish Mathematical Society.

References

20th-century Spanish mathematicians
1915 births
2009 deaths
Spanish Jesuits
Spanish military personnel of the Spanish Civil War (National faction)
People from Olot
Jesuit scientists